Chantavit Dhanasevi (nicknamed Ter) is a Thai actor and screenwriter. He is best known for his lead role in the 2010 film Hello Stranger, 2012 film ATM: Er Rak Error, and 2016 movie, One Day.

Early life
Dhanasevi studied at Chulalongkorn University and graduated with a bachelor's degree of Communication Arts majoring in Motion Pictures and Still Photography.  During his campus life, he worked in several faculty stage plays from 2001 to 2006.

Career
After graduation, Dhanasevi began work as a freelancer and started doing screen-writing, assistant directing, off-shot cinematographing, and acting coach jobs for GTH. He acted in several small roles in a lot of GTH films until 2008, when he got one of the main roles in Hormones. He then had another lead role in the horror film Coming Soon. He also was credited for screenwriting of 4Bia and Phobia 2 in 2008-2009.

In 2010, Dhanasevi became an actor after doing the romantic comedy Hello Stranger with Neungthida Sopon, in which he also was credited as co-screenwriter. His role earned him a Star Hunter award as one of the 10 most promising young actors in Asia at Shanghai International Film Festival 2011. In 2012, he came back with another film, ATM: Er Rak Error along with a new actress, Preechaya Pongthananikorn. ATM became GTH's highest-grossing film ever at that time (later surpassed by Pee Mak in 2013). In 2013, Dhanasevi co-wrote the film Pee Mak.

Personal life 
Dhanasevi had a relationship with Pattarasaya Kreursuwansiri for nearly seven years.

In mid-2018, he began dating Davika Hoorne.

Filmography

Screenwriter

Film

Television
 2014 Naruk (XACT-SCENARIO/Ch.5) as Nai With Kaneungnij Jaksamittanon
 2015 Phu Khong Yod Rak (TV Thunder/Ch.3) as Phan Namsupan With Rasri Balenciaga Chirathiwat
 2017 Chai Mai Jing Ying Tae (The One Enterprise Public/One 31) as Phakorn Sedthahiran (Phak) With Davika Hoorne
 2017 Nang Sao Mai Jam Kad Nam Sakul (The One Enterprise Public/One 31) as Aong Sa With Davika Hoorne
 2019 Rak Jung Oei (Mahaniyonchomchab/Ch.3) as Damrong (Phoo Yai Dam) With Natapohn Tameeruks
 2020 Pleng Rak Chao Phraya (The One Enterprise Public-Por Dee kam/One 31) as Ton Jaopraya With Alisa Kunkwaeng
 2021 Help Me Khun Pee Chuay Duay (TV SCENE/Ch.3) as Arnon Srimankongying (Non) With Kannarun Wongkajornklai / Diana Flipo

Series
 2009 Sai Lub The Series (/Modernine) as Shu
 2010 Muad Opas Yod Mue Prab...Ka Dee Pissawong (/Modernine) as Muad Opas
 2011 Muad Opas The Series - Season 2 (/Modernine) as Muad Opas
 2013 ATM 2: Koo Ver Er Rak (/) as
 2016 Diary of Tootsie (/GDH559) as Escort - cameo 
 2020 The Con-Heartist (/GDH559) as Sam

Sitcom
 2009 Suek Wan Shu Jai (/Ch.7) as Shu

Director

Stage play
2012 Lum-Sing Singer as Paladkick (with Khemanit Jamikorn)

Awards and nominations

References

External links

 
 Chantavit Dhanasevi at Viki.com

1983 births
Living people
Chantavit Dhanasevi
Chantavit Dhanasevi
Chantavit Dhanasevi
Chantavit Dhanasevi
Chantavit Dhanasevi
Chantavit Dhanasevi
Chantavit Dhanasevi
Chantavit Dhanasevi
Chantavit Dhanasevi
Chantavit Dhanasevi